The Scottish Independence Referendum (Franchise) Act 2013 is an Act of the Scottish Parliament that, together with the Scottish Independence Referendum Act 2013, enabled the Scottish independence referendum of 2014.

The Act set the scope for the franchise for the referendum, defining those able to vote as those aged 16 or over who were registered as voters either through the existing local government voters' register or a new "young voters" register, and holding an appropriate citizenship (Commonwealth, Irish or EU member state), with the exception of specific groups not eligible to vote in the referendum, such as convicted prisoners, and those excluded from voting at local government elections by other election laws.

External links 
 Scottish Independence Referendum (Franchise) Act 2013 (official text)  Retrieved 23 September 2014

Acts of the Scottish Parliament 2013
2014 Scottish independence referendum